The Watkins 29, also known as the W29, is an American sailboat that was designed by Walter Scott in conjunction with the Watkins brothers and first built in 1984.

The Watkins 29 design had a minor design change to the transom in 1987 and was renamed the Watkins 30, also known as the W30.

Production
The design was built by Watkins Yachts in Clearwater, Florida, United States, but it is now out of production. A total of 60 W29s were completed between 1984 and 1988, while 28 W30s were completed between 1987 and 1989. The last W30 completed was moulded in April 1989 as a 1990 model.

Design
The Watkins 29 and 30 are recreational keelboats, built predominantly of fiberglass, with wood trim. They have a masthead sloop rig, a raked stem, a nearly vertical transom on the W29 and a reverse transom on the W30, a skeg-mounted rudder controlled by a tiller and a fixed fin keel. Both models displace  and carry  of ballast.

The design's hull is molded in a single piece using polyester resin and fiberglass woven roving, as well as multidirectional chopped strand fibers (MSCF). The keel is integral to the hull and the ballast is internal to the keel. The deck and the cockpit are moulded in one piece, also using polyester resin and fiberglass woven roving with MCSF. Plywood coring is employed for the cabin top, deck, seat and the cockpit sole for stiffness. The hull-to-deck joint is flanged, glued and then screwed into place. There is an aluminum toe rail, stainless steel through-bolted into place, bonding the toe rail, deck and the hull.

An anchor well is located at the bow with a hawspipe leading the anchor chain into the "V" berth locker.

The boat is fitted with a  Japanese Yanmar 2GM or  3GM diesel engine for docking and maneuvering.

Sleeping accommodation is provided for five people, with an aft cabin and a bow "V"-berth, both doubles. The main cabin has a quarter berth or optional double pull-out berth. The head is on the port side, aft of the bow "V"-berth and has pressurized water and a shower. The galley is at the bottom of the companionway stairs to starboard and includes a sink, stove and an icebox.

Ventilation is provided by eight opening ports and one deck-mounted hatch. The main cabin has  of headroom and is finished with hand-rubbed teak trim, with the bulkheads and cabinetry made from teak veneer on plywood. The main cabin sole is teak and holly veneer over plywood.

Operational history
The boat is supported by an active class club, the Watkins Owners.

See also
List of sailing boat types

Similar sailboats
Alberg 29
Bayfield 29 
C&C 29
Cal 29
Hunter 290
Island Packet 29
Mirage 29
Northwind 29
Prospect 900
Tanzer 29
Thames Marine Mirage 29

References

Keelboats
1980s sailboat type designs
Sailing yachts
Sailboat type designs by Walter Scott
Sailboat type designs by Watkins brothers
Sailboat types built by Watkins Yachts